Eva Olsson (born 12 October 1960) is a Swedish physicist who is a professor at Chalmers University of Technology. She is a member of the Royal Swedish Academy of Sciences and part of the selection committee for the Nobel Prize in Physics.

Early life and education 
Olsson was an undergraduate student in Gothenburg at the Chalmers University of Technology, where she specialised in engineering physics. She worked on mirror furnaces for her undergraduate diploma. After graduating, she remained at Chalmers and started a doctoral research project studying the interfacial structures of zinc oxide varistor materials. She moved to the United States as a researcher with David R. Clarke at IBM. She returned to the Chalmers University of Technology in 1991, where she was eventually awarded her docent degree.

Research and career 
Olsson was appointed associate professor at Chalmers in 1996. She was appointed professor at Uppsala University a year later, where she worked for four years before returning to Chalmers as a full professor. At Chalmers, Olsson has served as Director of Material Analysis, Head of Microscopy and Head of Applied Physics.

Olsson develops novel characterisation techniques for materials. She is mainly interested in materials for emerging technologies, including catalysis, photovoltaic and quantum devices. In particular, Olsson works with electron microscopy. In 2013, Olsson was awarded  from the Knut and Alice Wallenberg Foundation, with which she developed soft microscopy. Soft microscopy involves developing ways to use electron microscopes to study soft and semi-hard materials, creating new avenues for advances in material science.

When characterising gold using an electron microscope at the highest level of magnification, it was discovered that they could force gold to melt at room temperature. The initial discovery was made by Ludvig de Knoop who was a researcher in her group. He noticed that the surface of gold lost its bonds under the bombardment with electrons within an electron microscope. Knoop and Olsson were among those who wrote the paper for the journal Physical Review Materials in 2018. Olsson could see applications of this phenomenon for sensors and transistors. In 2018, she was awarded a further  to study plasmon-exciton coupling.

Olsson is a member of the Nobel Prize in Physics Selection Committee. When men won all of the science Nobel prizes in 2021, Olsson said "We want to have more women nominated".

Selected publications

References 

Members of the Royal Swedish Academy of Sciences
Academic staff of the Chalmers University of Technology
Swedish women physicists
1960 births
Living people